The Nandi Awards are presented annually in Andhra Pradesh, For Telugu cinema by State government. "Nandi" means "bull", the awards being named after the big granite bull at Lepakshi — a cultural and historical symbol of Andhra Pradesh. Nandi Awards are presented in four categories: Gold, Silver, Bronze, and Copper.

The Nandi awards for the year 2006 were announced on 12 February 2008 at Hyderabad.

Nandi Awards 2006 Winners List

See also
Nandi Awards of 2010
Nandi Awards of 2011

References

2006
2006 Indian film awards